Golubac (Serbian Cyrillic: Голубац) is a mountain in central Serbia, near the town of Guča. Its highest peak Stanojev vrh has an elevation of  733 meters above sea level.

References

Mountains of Serbia